Djerba, also transliterated as Jerba or Jarbah, is a Tunisian island and the largest island of North Africa at , in the Gulf of Gabès, off the coast of Tunisia. It had a population of 139,544 at the 2004 census, which rose to 163,726 at the 2014 census. Citing the long and unique history of its Jewish minority in Djerba, Tunisia has sought UNESCO World Heritage status protections for the island.

History 
Legend has it that Djerba was the island of the lotus-eaters where Odysseus was stranded on his voyage through the Mediterranean Sea. 

The island was called Meninx until the third century AD. Strabo writes that there was an altar of Odysseus.

The island was controlled twice by the Norman Kingdom of Sicily: in 1135–1158 and in 1284–1333. During the second of these periods it was organised as a feudal lordship, with the following Lords of Jerba: 

 1284–1305: Roger I
 1305–1307, and 1307–1310: Roger II (twice)
 1310: Charles
 1310: Francis-Roger III

In the 14th century, the Borj El Kebir castle was built, on top of Roman ruins. The Tunisian government took possession of the castle in 1903, and later converted it into a museum.

An archaeological field survey of Djerba carried out between 1995 and 2000 under the auspices of the University of Pennsylvania, the American Academy in Rome and the Tunisian Institut National du Patrimoine, revealed over 400 archaeological sites, including many Punic and Roman villas and an Amphitheatre.

Jewish history 

According to their oral history, the Jewish minority has dwelled on the island continuously for more than 2,500 years. The first physical evidence that historians know of comes from the 11th century found in Cairo Geniza.

This community is unique in the Jewish diaspora for its unusually high percentage of Kohanim (Hebrew; the Jewish priestly caste), direct patrilineal descendants of Aaron the first high priest from Mosaic times. Local tradition holds that when Nebuchadnezzar II leveled Solomon's temple and laid waste to Judah and the city of Jerusalem in the year 586 BC, the Kohanim who settled in Djerba were among the refugees who were able to avoid slavery.

A key point in this oral history has been backed up by genetic tests for Cohen modal haplotype showing that the vast majority of male Jews on Djerba claiming the family status of Cohen had a common ancient male ancestor which matches that of nearly all of both historically European and Middle Eastern Jewish males with a family history of patrilineal membership in the Jewish priestly caste. Thus, the island has been known by many Jews as the island of the Kohanim. According to the legend, during the destruction of the temple, the Kohanim, who were serving the temple at the time of destruction escaped from Jerusalem and found themselves on the island of Djerba. The legend claims the Kohanim carried the door and some stones from the Temple in Jerusalem which they then incorporated into the "marvelous synagogue", also known as Ghriba, which still stands in Djerba.

The Jewish community differs from others in Djerba in their dress, personal names, and accents. The Jewish rabbinate of Djerba have established an eruv, which establishes the communal area in the city in which Jews can freely carry objects between their homes and community buildings on Shabbat. Some traditions that are distinctive of the Jewish Djerba community is the kiddush prayer said on the eve of Passover and a few prophetic passages on certain Shabbats of the year.

One of the community's synagogues, the El Ghriba synagogue, has been in continuous use for over 2,000 years. The Jews were settled in two main communities: the Hara Kabira ("the big quarter";Arabic:"الحاره الكبيرة") and the Hara Saghira ("the small quarter";Arabic:" الحاره الصّغيرة"). The Hara Saghira identified itself with Israel, while the Hara Kabira identified with Spain and Morocco.

The next influx of Jewish people to the Island of Djerba occurred during the Spanish Inquisition, when the Iberian Jewish population was expelled. The Jewish population hit its peak during the time that Tunisia was fighting for independence from France 1881–1956. In 1940, there were approximately 100,000 Jewish-Tunisians or 15% of the entire population of Tunisia.

In the aftermath of World War II, the Jewish population on the island declined significantly due to emigration to Israel and France. , the Jewish permanent resident community on the island numbered about 1,000, but many return annually on pilgrimage. However, once the State of Israel was established, and political unrest in the Middle East and North Africa was building up many Jewish people were expelled from Tunisia. Although the Jewish community of Tunisia was on the decline, the Jewish community of Hara Kebira witnessed an increase of population due to its traditional character. The community on Djerba remains one of the last remaining fully intact Jewish communities in an Arab majority country after most were abandoned in the face of anti-Israel and antisemitic pressure and pogroms. The most traditionally observant Jewish community is growing because of large natural families despite emigration and a new Orthodox Jewish school for girls has recently been inaugurated on the Island to serve alongside the two boys yeshiva schools. According to The Wall Street Journal "Relations between Jews and Muslims are complex—proper and respectful, though not especially close. Jewish men work alongside Arab merchants in the souk, for example, and enjoy amicable ties with Muslim customers."

The historical conflicts between Muslims and Jewish people have been largely absent in Djerba. This is reportedly attributed to the fact that all the people of the island were at some point Jewish and therefore share similar practices in their ways of life. Some of these Jewish practices that can be seen in Muslim households in Djerba are the lighting of candles on Friday night, and the suspending of matzot on the ceiling from one spring to the next. The Jewish and Muslim communities have coexisted peacefully in Djerba despite political unrest regarding the Israeli-Palestinian conflict. The people of Djerba say that the two communities simply pray in different places, but are still able to converse. A Jewish leader once stated "We live together, We visit our friends on their religious holidays. We work together. Muslims buy meat from our butchers. When we are forbidden to work or cook on the Shabbat, we buy bread and kosher food cooking by Muslims. Our children play together".

On 11 April 2002, Al-Qaeda claimed responsibility for a truck bomb attack close to the famous synagogue, killing 21 people (14 German tourists, 5 Tunisians, and 2 French nationals).

Since the "Arab Spring", the Tunisian government has extended its protection and encouraged Jewish life on the island of Djerba. Citing the long and unique Jewish history on Djerba, Tunisia has sought UNESCO World Heritage status for the island. There are currently 14 synagogues, 2 yeshivot, and 3 kosher eateries.

A Jewish school on the island was firebombed during the national protests held in 2018, while security forces in Djerba were reduced, being preoccupied with protection efforts elsewhere. This attack was among many other uprisings that were occurring throughout Tunisia at the time.

Ecclesiastical history 

The city Girba in the Roman province of Tripolitania (mostly in modern Libya), which gave its name to the island, was important enough to become a suffragan bishop of its capital's archbishopric. Known Bishops of antiquity include:
 Proculus (Maximus Bishop fl.393)
 Quodvultdeus (Catholic Bishop fl.401–411) attending Council of Carthage (411) 
 Euasius (Donatist Bishop fl.411) rival at Council of Carthage
 Urbanus (Catholic bishop fl.445–454)
 Faustinus (Catholic bishop fl. 484), exiled by King Huneric of the Vandal Kingdom
 Vincentius (Catholic bishop fl. 523–525)

The 1909 Catholic Encyclopedia lists only two: "At least two bishops of Girba are known, Monnulus and Vincent, who assisted at the Councils, of Carthage in 255 and 525".

Climate 
Djerba has a Hot semi-arid climate (Köppen climate classification BSh).

Migratory bird sanctuary
Djerba Bin El Ouedian is a wetland and habitat for migratory birds. It is located at 33 ° 40 'N, 10 ° 55 'E. On 7 November 2007 the wetland was included on the list of Ramsar sites under the Ramsar Convention, due to its importance as a bird refuge.

See also 

 European enclaves in North Africa before 1830
 Borj El Kebir
 Menachem Mazuz, former Attorney General of Israel & supreme judge
 Yael Shelbia, Israeli model, descendant of Djerba inhabitants 
 Djerba–Zarzis International Airport
 Menzel (Djerba)

Notes

References

External links

 GigaCatholic with titular see incumbent biography links

 
Ancient Greek geography of North Africa
Girba
Historic Jewish communities
Islands of Tunisia
Jewish Tunisian history
Medenine Governorate
Mediterranean islands
Ottoman Tunisia